Suzanne Miles (born November 18, 1970) is a Republican politician from her native Owensboro, Kentucky, who represents the 7th District (Daviess, Henderson, and Union counties) in the Kentucky House of Representatives.

Early life and education
Miles graduated from Apollo High School in Owensboro, and continued her education at Transylvania University in Lexington, Kentucky.  During her senior year at Transylvania, Miles became a small business owner when she purchased a clothing store in Owensboro, Kentucky.  Shortly after graduating from Transylvania, Miles began working at Town and Countrywear Ladies Clothing and Accessories, which she owned and operated until 2008. Miles continues to live in Owensboro to this day.

Political career
Miles won her position in a special election held on December 10, 2013. She defeated Democrat Kim Humphrey of Morganfield in Union County, 3,548 (50.8 percent) to 3,436 votes (49.2 percent). Miles's narrow victory was propelled by her strong showing in her own Daviess County in western Kentucky, where she and her father, Billy Joe Miles, are well known. She beat Humphrey 2,564 to 976 in Daviess County.

The seat opened when Democrat John Arnold, Jr., of Sturgis in Union County resigned in September amid allegations that he had sexually harassed legislative staffers. Arnold had won the seat by only five votes over the Republican Tim Kline in the general election held on November 6, 2012.

Prior to her election to the legislature, Miles had been a district representative for U.S. Representative Brett Guthrie of Kentucky's 2nd congressional district. Miles became the 46th Republican in the Kentucky House, the highest strength her minority party has held in the chamber since 1921.

References

1970 births
Living people
Politicians from Owensboro, Kentucky
Businesspeople from Kentucky
Republican Party members of the Kentucky House of Representatives
Women state legislators in Kentucky
Transylvania University alumni
21st-century American politicians
21st-century American women politicians